Francesco Cangi (born 15 December 1982) is an Italian footballer who currently plays for Sansepolcro.

References

External links 
 Francesco Cangi at Footballdatabase

1982 births
Living people
People from Città di Castello
Italian footballers
Hellas Verona F.C. players
F.C. Crotone players
A.C. Perugia Calcio players
U.S. Cremonese players
Association football defenders
Sportspeople from the Province of Perugia

Association football forwards
Footballers from Umbria